In astronomy, the lithium problem or lithium discrepancy refers to the discrepancy between the primordial abundance of lithium as inferred from observations of metal-poor (Population II) halo stars in our galaxy and the amount that should theoretically exist due to Big Bang nucleosynthesis+WMAP cosmic baryon density predictions of the CMB. Namely, the most widely accepted models of the Big Bang suggest that three times as much primordial lithium, in particular lithium-7, should exist. This contrasts with the observed abundance of isotopes of hydrogen (1H and 2H) and helium (3He and 4He) that are consistent with predictions. The discrepancy is highlighted in a so-called "Schramm plot", named in honor of astrophysicist David Schramm, which depicts these primordial abundances as a function of cosmic baryon content from standard BBN predictions.

Origin of lithium

Minutes after the Big Bang, the universe was made almost entirely of hydrogen and helium, with trace amounts of lithium and beryllium, and negligibly small abundances of all heavier elements.

Lithium synthesis in the Big Bang
Big Bang nucleosynthesis produced both lithium-7 and beryllium-7, and indeed the latter dominates the primordial synthesis of mass 7 nuclides. On the other hand, the Big Bang produced lithium-6 at levels more than 1000 times smaller.    
 later decayed via electron capture (half-life 53.22 days) into ,

These isotopes
are produced by the reactions
:{| border="0"
|- style="height:2em;"
| ||+ || ||→ || ||+ ||
|- style="height:2em;"
| ||+ || ||→ || ||+ ||
|- style="height:2em;"
|}
and destroyed by
:{| border="0"
|- style="height:2em;"
| ||+ || ||→ || ||+ ||
|- style="height:2em;"
| ||+ || ||→ || ||+ ||
|- style="height:2em;"
|}

The amount of lithium generated in the Big Bang can be calculated. Hydrogen-1 is the most abundant nuclide, comprising roughly 92% of the atoms in the Universe, with helium-4 second at 8%. Other isotopes including 2H, 3H, 3He, 6Li, 7Li, and 7Be are much rarer; the estimated abundance of primordial lithium is 10−10 relative to hydrogen. The calculated abundance and ratio of 1H and 4He is in agreement with data from observations of young stars.

The P-P II branch

In stars, lithium-7 is made in a proton-proton chain reaction.

:{| border="0"
|- style="height:2em;"
| ||+ || ||→ || ||+ ||
|- style="height:2em;"
| ||+ || ||→ || ||+ || ||+ || ||/ ||
|- style="height:2em;"
| ||+ || ||→ ||2 
|}

Observed abundance of lithium

Despite the low theoretical abundance of lithium, the actual observable amount is less than the calculated amount by a factor of 3–4. This contrasts with the observed abundance of isotopes of hydrogen (1H and 2H) and helium (3He and 4He) that are consistent with predictions.

Older stars seem to have less lithium than they should, and some younger stars have much more. One proposed model is that lithium produced during a star's youth sinks beneath the star's atmosphere (where it is obscured from direct observation) due to effects the authors describe as "turbulent mixing" and "diffusion," which are suggested to increase or accumulate as the star ages. Spectroscopic observations of stars in NGC 6397, a metal-poor globular cluster, are consistent with an inverse relation between lithium abundance and age, but a theoretical mechanism for diffusion has not been formalized. Though it transmutes into two atoms of helium due to collision with a proton at temperatures above 2.4 million degrees Celsius (most stars easily attain this temperature in their interiors), lithium is more abundant than current computations would predict in later-generation stars.

Lithium is also found in brown dwarf substellar objects and certain anomalous orange stars. Because lithium is present in cooler, less massive brown dwarfs, but is destroyed in hotter red dwarf stars, its presence in the stars' spectra can be used in the "lithium test" to differentiate the two, as both are smaller than the Sun.

Less lithium in Sun-like stars with planets

Sun-like stars without planets have 10 times the lithium as Sun-like stars with planets in a sample of 500 stars. The Sun's surface layers have less than 1% the lithium of the original formation protosolar gas clouds despite the surface convective zone not being quite hot enough to burn lithium. It is suspected that the gravitational pull of planets might enhance the churning up of the star's surface, driving the lithium to hotter cores where lithium burning occurs. The absence of lithium could also be a way to find new planetary systems. However, this claimed relationship has become a point of contention in the planetary astrophysics community, being frequently denied but also supported.

Higher than expected lithium in metal-poor stars

Certain orange stars can also contain a high concentration of lithium. Those orange stars found to have a higher than usual concentration of lithium orbit massive objects—neutron stars or black holes—whose gravity evidently pulls heavier lithium to the surface of a hydrogen-helium star, causing more lithium to be observed.

Proposed solutions

Possible solutions fall into three broad classes.

Astrophysical solutions 
Considering the possibility that BBN predictions are sound, the measured value of the primordial lithium abundance should be in error and astrophysical solutions offer revision to it. For example, systematic errors, including ionization correction and inaccurate stellar temperatures determination could affect Li/H ratios in stars. Furthermore, more observations on lithium depletion remain important since present lithium levels might not reflect the initial abundance in the star. In summary, accurate measurements of the primordial lithium abundance is the current focus of progress, and it could be possible that the final answer does not lie in astrophysical solutions.

Some astronomers suggest that the velocities of nucleons do not follow Maxwell-Boltzmann distribution. They test the framework of Tsallis non-extensive statistics.Their result suggest that 1.069<q<1.082 is a possible new solution to the cosmological lithium problem.

Nuclear physics solutions 
When one considers the possibility that the measured primordial Lithium abundance is correct and based on the Standard Model of particle physics and the standard cosmology, the lithium problem implies errors in the BBN light element predictions. Although standard BBN rests on well-determined physics, the weak and strong interactions are complicated for BBN and therefore might be the weak point in standard BBN calculation.

Firstly, incorrect or missing reactions could give rise to the lithium problem. For incorrect reactions, major thoughts lie within revision to cross section errors and standard thermonuclear rates according to recent studies.

Second, starting from Fred Hoyle's discovery of a resonance in carbon-12, an important factor in the triple-alpha process, resonance reactions, some of which might have evaded experimental detection or whose effects have been underestimated, become possible solutions to the lithium problem.

Solutions beyond the Standard Model 
Under the assumptions of all correct calculation, solutions beyond the existing Standard Model or standard cosmology might be needed.

Dark matter decay and supersymmetry provide one possibility, in which decaying dark matter scenarios introduce a rich array of novel processes that can alter light elements during and after BBN, and find the well-motivated origin in supersymmetric cosmologies. With the fully operational Large Hadron Collider (LHC), much of minimal supersymmetry lies within reach, which would revolutionize particle physics and cosmology if discovered; however, results from the ATLAS experiment in 2020 have excluded many supersymmetric models.

Changing fundamental constants can be one possible solution, and it implies that first, atomic transitions in metals residing in high-redshift regions might behave differently from our own. Additionally, Standard Model couplings and particle masses might vary; third, variation in nuclear physics parameters is needed.

Nonstandard cosmologies indicate variation of the baryon to photon ratio in different regions. One proposal is a result of large-scale inhomogeneities in cosmic density, different from homogeneity defined in the cosmological principle. However, this possibility requires a large amount of observations to test it.

See also 

 Big Bang
 Halo nucleus
 Isotopes of lithium
 List of unsolved problems in physics
 Lithium burning

References

Lithium
Big Bang
Nucleosynthesis